Delores Seneva Williams (November 17, 1937-November 17, 2022) was an American Presbyterian theologian notable for her formative role in the development of womanist theology and best known for her book Sisters in the Wilderness. Her writings discussed how the intersection of race, gender, and class played a role in black women's lives. As opposed to feminist theology as it was predominantly practiced by white women and black theology as predominantly practiced by black men, Williams argued that black women's oppression deepens the analysis of oppression in theology.

Her book, Sisters in the Wilderness, helped establish the field of womanist theology. In it, Williams primarily develops a rereading of the biblical figure, Hagar, to illuminate the importance of issues of reproduction and surrogacy in black women's oppression. According to Aaron McEmrys, "Williams offers a theological response to the defilement of black women.... Womanism is an approach to ethics, theology and life rooted in the experiences of African-American women".

The term womanism was coined by a contemporary of Williams, Alice Walker, used in her 1979 short story "Coming Apart" and again in her 1983 essay collection In Search of Our Mothers' Gardens.

Biography 
Delores Williams earned her PhD from Union Theological Seminary, and later became the Paul Tillich Professor of Feminist Theology at Union. Her title was later changed to the Paul Tillich Professor of Theology and Culture. After retirement, she became Professor Emerita.

William's writings helped develop the field of Womanist Theology.  In 1977, she wrote an article entitled, "Womanist Theology: Black Women's Voices," which Cheryl A. Kirk-Duggan notes as being a "seminal moment" in the development of the field.  She published Sisters in the Wilderness: The Challenge of Womanist God-Talk in 1993.

Williams published many articles and chapters in books. She authored the eighth chapter of Transforming the Faiths of our Fathers: Women who Changed American Religion (2004), edited by Ann Braude.

Womanism
The term Womanism developed out of Black Feminism, and was coined by Alice Walker. In her observation, Delores S. Williams noted that Womanism and Black Feminism are both "organically related" to white feminism; however, she observed that most white feminists led movements have usually exclude Black Feminist and Womanist experiences and concerns.

While some white women advocated for more radical critiques of oppression that included race, many white women and often the most popular conceptions of feminism were centered on achieving individual and relational equality with white men as the means to eliminate sexism. For Black women, it is not only that equality would include the elimination of racism and classism, something that feminism did not directly address, but that it would also require a redefinition of equality in the first place rather than conflating it with white men's social position. 
 
As a practice of thought, womanism intends to attend to the particularity and specificity of black women's experiences in order to cultivate methods and concepts which are adequate to their situation. The goal of the womanist movement was not only to eliminate inequalities but to assist black women in reconnecting with their roots in religion and culture and to reflect and improve on "self, community and society".

Sisters in the Wilderness
In 1993, Williams published Sisters in the Wilderness: The Challenge of Womanist God-Talk.   Using black women's experience of struggle as a starting place for biblical analysis, Williams explores themes from the story of Hagar in the wilderness. The biblical character Hagar, was a concubine of Abraham, and servant to both Abraham and his wife Sarah. Williams notes similarities between Hagar's role as handmaiden, giving birth to Ishmael when Sarah and Abraham were unable to conceive, and the role of black women in caring for white children during and after slavery. The biblical story of Hagar's ability to survive in the wilderness has resonated with many black women who have found the strength to survive and persevere through adversity by leaning on their God.

In particular, Williams' notes the ways Hagar's position in relation to Sarah was comparable to black women's roles as mothers, both within their own communities, and in relation to white women. She argues that the system of slavery forced enslaved mothers to take on the roles of "protecting, providing for, resisting oppression and liberating" their loved ones. Yet, like Hagar, many Black women were forced into surrogacy roles in white families, forced to produce children or take care of their master's children, and after slavery, working for low wages as laborers in the homes of white people.

In the second half of the book, Williams examines how the womanist perspective provides distinct insights to theology. Williams argues that Black women's experience has been overlooked in theology, including black liberation theology and white feminist theology, and that womanist theology, by centering black women's experience, offers an important corrective. "The issue is an understanding of biblical accounts about God that allows various communities of poor, oppressed black women and men to hear and see the doing of the good news in a way that is meaningful for their lives."

Dialogue between Womanist theologians and other liberation theologies 
Williams supported dialogue between feminists and womanists as well as between womanists and black liberationists, Asian feminist theologians, and mujerista theologians – to achieve a greater good. While she was not naïve in believing that this alone would eradicate racism or sexism, Williams found a dialogical sharing of resources was important because "all women regardless of race or class, have developed survival strategies that have helped [them to] arrive sane at [their] present social and cultural locations".

She recognized that "there has been little to no conversations among women for the purpose of swapping stories about the nature of these survival strategies". She stated in the Journal of Feminist Studies in Religion: "we feminist-womanist women need to remember, commemorate, and lift up for ourselves and subsequent generations of women the resistance events and ideas that have birthed and kept alive women’s rights struggle...create resistant rituals that can be enacted wherever feminist and womanist meet to share survival strategies and plan attacks upon patriarchal and white supremacist mind-sets and practices in American institutional life." By sharing survival stories, new resources are developed for resistance.

References

Further reading
McEmrys, Aaron (2006). "Engaging the sacred wisdom of our sisters in the wilderness: A unitarian universalist/womanist dialogue". Discourse: The Journal of Liberal Religion 7(1), 1–17.
Pinnock, Sarah. (2005). "Williams, Delores S." In Bron Taylor (ed.), Encyclopedia of Religion and Nature (Vol. 1, pp. 1751). Oxford University Press.
Russell, Letty M. (1993). Church in the Round: Feminist interpretation of the church. Louisville, KY: Westminster John Knox Press.
Williams, Delores S. (1993). "Visions, inner voices, apparitions, and defiance in nineteenth-century black women’s narratives". Woman’s Studies Quarterly (Vol. 21, pp. 81–89). New York: Feminist Press.

1937 births
2022 deaths
20th-century American theologians
Women Christian theologians
20th-century Calvinist and Reformed theologians
African-American feminists
African-American theologians
African-American women writers
American Calvinist and Reformed theologians
American feminists
American Presbyterians
American women non-fiction writers
Black feminism
Place of birth missing
Womanist theologians
20th-century African-American women
21st-century African-American people
21st-century African-American women